Interstate 480 (I-480) is a  auxiliary Interstate Highway that connects I-80 in Downtown Omaha, Nebraska, with I-29 in Council Bluffs, Iowa. The portion of I-480 in Nebraska has been named the Gerald R. Ford Expressway, named in honor of the former president, who was a native of Omaha. I-480 includes the Grenville Dodge Memorial Bridge over the Missouri River.

Route description

I-480 begins at an interchange with I-80 to the east and west and with US 75, known as the Kennedy Freeway, to the south. Going north, I-480 passes the Hanscom Park neighborhood to the west and the Vinton Street Commercial Historic District to the east. At exit 1A, I-480 intersects Martha Street, which before January 1, 2003, was the eastern end of Nebraska Highway 38 (N-38). North of Martha Street, I-480 passes the Gerald R. Ford Birthsite and Gardens. At the Leavenworth Street exit, the highway divides the Leavenworth neighborhood from the Old Market neighborhood. Shortly after the Leavenworth Street exit is the Harney Street exit, which provides access to US 6 from eastbound I-480. before the North Freeway interchange, I-480 passes beneath Dodge and Douglas streets, which are the westbound and eastbound lanes of US 6, respectively.

Just to the southwest of the Creighton University campus is the North Freeway interchange, where US 75 leaves eastbound I-480 and joins westbound. The North Freeway was originally planned to be an Interstate Highway, "I-580", connecting northern Omaha to downtown, but this project was canceled with the interchange in midst of construction. A number of so-called ghost ramps can be found, but these are being eliminated during the reconstruction of this interchange. Here, I-480 turns to the east toward Council Bluffs, Iowa. I-480 passes between the NoDo and Downtown Omaha neighborhoods. Farther east, it dips to the southeast near CHI Health Center Omaha, part of the NoDo neighborhood. Immediately before crossing the Missouri River, US 6 joins I-480 to cross into Iowa. This bridge over the Missouri River was constructed in 1965–1966 to replace the old Ak-Sar-Ben Bridge which had been the first highway bridge across the river in this area.

Upon entering Council Bluffs, I-480 meets up with I-29 just  from the Missouri River. On the other side of this interchange, I-480 ends where US 6 traffic encounters signal-controlled intersections.

History

In the late 1950s, the construction of what was then referred to as Route 3 was highly controversial. It conveniently crossed through the western and northern edges of Downtown Omaha, two areas city leaders had considered "blighted" since the 1930s. The heavily Catholic, ethnic European neighborhoods the route went through rallied against the demolition of their homes, and the city's parks advocates provided resistance as well.  Eventually, the Interstate planners won out, and the city's historic Jefferson Square was demolished, as well as dozens of homes along the route.

However, this bill was tabled in the committee.

In 2004, the Nebraska Department of Roads (now the Nebraska Department of Transportation [NDOT]) began a project to reconstruct the I-480/US 75 interchange. Work took place in three phases spread out over the course of six years. The project was completed in May 2011 just in time for the College World Series.

Exit list

References

External links

Expressways in the Omaha area
Transportation in Omaha, Nebraska
Council Bluffs, Iowa
80-4 Iowa-Nebraska
80-4
80-4
4 Iowa-Nebraska
80-4
Transportation in Douglas County, Nebraska
Transportation in Pottawattamie County, Iowa